Danhatchia is a genus of terrestrial orchids, lacking chlorophyll and obtaining nutrients from fungi in the soil. Three species are known, Danhatchia australis, native to New Zealand (both main islands) and to New South Wales, and Danhatchia copelandii and Danhatchia novaehollandiae, both native to New South Wales in Australia.

References

External links

Cranichideae genera
Myco-heterotrophic orchids
Goodyerinae